Aceguá is a divided town in two countries:

 Aceguá, Brazil
 Aceguá, Uruguay